Ariane Hingst  (born 25 July 1979) is a German former footballer who works as an analyst for Fox Sports. She was primarily utilized as a defender or a defensive midfielder.

Club career
Hingst had played at several local clubs at junior level. At age 15, she played for the first team of Hertha Zehlendorf in the Regionalliga, then the second-highest division in Germany. In 1996 and 1997, Hingst won the league with Zehlendorf, but they failed to win their promotion play-offs both years. At that time, Germany's head coach Tina Theune had urged her to play at Bundesliga level, if she wanted to continue her international career.

Hingst joined newly promoted Bundesliga side Turbine Potsdam for the 1997–98 season. From 2001 to 2003, Potsdam was runner-up in the Bundesliga for three years in a row. Hingst won the Bundesliga title with Potsdam in 2004 and 2006, and claimed the German Cup competition from 2004 to 2006 three consecutive times. In the 2004–05 season, Potsdam also won the UEFA Women's Cup.

In 2007, Hingst moved to the Swedish first division side Djurgårdens IF Dam, where she played for two years, finishing runner-up in the league both seasons. She returned to Germany in 2009, joining 1. FFC Frankfurt. In her third season at the club, she won the 2011 German Cup. It was announced after Germany's poor 2011 FIFA Women's World Cup campaign, that she would leave 1. FFC Frankfurt. In October 2011 she signed to Australian club Newcastle Jets FC. On 29 September 2012, she signed for W-League side Canberra United.

International career
Hingst made her debut for the Germany national team in August 1996 against the Netherlands. One year later, she won her first international title at the 1997 European Championship. The final against Italy was her only game in the starting line-up. At the 1999 FIFA Women's World Cup, Hingst was Germany's youngest player in the squad, yet she started in all matches and scored one goal in a group match. The team was eliminated in the quarter-finals. At the 2000 Summer Olympics, Hingst won bronze with the German team. She scored after 88 minutes in the final first round match against Sweden, which secured Germany's first place in the group.

Hingst again won the European Championship in 2001, which was played on home soil in Germany. However, she was only used sparely and did not appear in the final of the tournament. Hingst was part of Germany's winning squad at the 2003 FIFA Women's World Cup, starting in all matches for Germany. One year later, she went on to win the bronze medal at the Summer Olympics, and in 2005, she claimed her third European Championship. Hingst was one of the team's key players at Germany's successful title defence at the 2007 FIFA Women's World Cup. Alongside Kerstin Stegemann, Annike Krahn and Linda Bresonik, she was part of Germany's defence which did not concede a single goal in the entire tournament.

One year later, she won her third bronze medal at the 2008 Summer Olympics and she was part of the team to win Germany's seventh title at the European Championship. Hingst was also called up for Germany's 2011 FIFA Women's World Cup squad. She announced her retirement from international football following the tournament as Germany's third most capped player with 173 appearances.

Honours
Turbine Potsdam
 UEFA Women's Cup: 2004–05
 Bundesliga: 2003–04, 2005–06
 DFB-Pokal: 2003–04, 2004–05, 2005–06,

1. FFC Frankfurt
 DFB Pokal: 2010–11

Germany
 FIFA World Cup: 2003, 2007
 UEFA European Championship: 1997, 2001, 2005, 2009
 Olympic bronze medal: 2000, 2004, 2008

Individual
 Silbernes Lorbeerblatt: 2007
 FIFA Women's World Cup All Star Team: 2007

References

External links

 
 
 

1979 births
Living people
German women's footballers
Germany women's international footballers
1999 FIFA Women's World Cup players
2003 FIFA Women's World Cup players
2007 FIFA Women's World Cup players
1. FFC Turbine Potsdam players
Footballers at the 2000 Summer Olympics
Footballers at the 2004 Summer Olympics
Footballers at the 2008 Summer Olympics
Olympic bronze medalists for Germany
Footballers from Berlin
1. FFC Frankfurt players
Expatriate footballers in Sweden
FIFA Century Club
Olympic medalists in football
2011 FIFA Women's World Cup players
Medalists at the 2008 Summer Olympics
Medalists at the 2004 Summer Olympics
FIFA Women's World Cup-winning players
Djurgårdens IF Fotboll (women) players
Medalists at the 2000 Summer Olympics
Expatriate women's soccer players in Australia
German expatriate sportspeople in Australia
Olympic footballers of Germany
UEFA Women's Championship-winning players
Women's association football defenders
Women's association football midfielders
Damallsvenskan players